Musikkens Hus (House of Music) is a venue in Aalborg, Denmark.  It is located at Musikkens Plads (Music Square) by the Limfjord in the new cultural center area of the city. Opened in March 2014, the building contains a concert hall and practice rooms for the Aalborg Symphony Orchestra and The Royal Academy of Music. Additional tenants include Orchestra Norden, as well as two of Aalborg University's fine arts divisions, Institute of Music and Danish JazzCenter.

The building features a solar-passive design and faces the riverfront. The educational rooms are constructed in a U shape around the central concert hall.

History 
After an international architecture competition, Coop Himmelb(l)au was selected to design the structure. Construction began in July 2010. The administrative offices moved into the building in July 2013.  A new-Nordic restaurant called Musikkens Spisehus (the Music's Eating House) also opened in 2013 in a section of the building with a view to Limfjord. Theatre and acoustics consulting was provided initially by Artec Consultants and later Arup.

The official opening of the concert hall took place March 29, 2014, and was attended  by Queen Margrethe II of Denmark. On 27 September 2014, Crown Prince Frederik and Princess Mary of Denmark presented the Crown Prince Couple's Awards in the hall.

Tenants 
The foundation is today the owner of Musikkens Hus and is therefore renting the facilities out to these:
Aalborg Symphony Orchestra has its administration, practice rooms, and concerts in the halls.
Aalborg University has its music education and research, and their department Danish JazzCenter is also located, in Musikkens Hus.
Orkester Norden has its administration, practice rooms, and concerts in the halls.
Royal Academy of Music has its education department and concert facilities in the building.

Facilities 
Musikkens Hus contains four halls and a number of practice rooms etc.:
The Concert Hall (or the Main Hall) seats 1,298 people
The Minor Hall seats 300 people
The Rhythmic Hall seats 200 people
The Classical Hall seats 200 people
The Foyer handles 2,150 people for receptions etc.
Musikkens Spisehus is the restaurant of Musikkens Hus and is located out to the Limfjord in two floors

Gallery

See also
 List of concert halls in Denmark

References

External links 

Official website

Buildings and structures in Aalborg
Tourist attractions in Aalborg
Concert halls in Denmark
Music venues completed in 2014
Music venues in Denmark
2013 establishments in Denmark